Maxim Gauci (11 February 1774 – 3 November 1854), born Massimo Gauci, was a Maltese lithographer and painter who was active in the United Kingdom in the 19th century. He was an early exponent of lithography for botanical illustration.

Life

Gauci was born in Valletta, Malta on 11 February 1774. He studied painting under Michele Busuttil, and was later sent to the Accademia di San Luca in Rome on the recommendation of Grand Master Emmanuel de Rohan-Polduc.

Gauci eventually moved to Paris, and married there in 1804. While he was there, he was known as Maxime Gauci and he worked in the studio of Jean-Baptiste Isabey. He was father of William Gauci, another printer, and the landscape painter Paul Gauci.

Gauci travelled to Egypt and the Middle East before settling in London in 1809. He never went back to Malta, but he was often visited by his relatives and other Maltese people. Gauci remained active until his eyesight began to decline, and he died in London on 3 November 1854, at the age of 80.

He was buried in the Gauci family grave on the western side of Highgate Cemetery.

Works
His firm completed works that included Nathaniel Wallich’s Plantae Asiaticae Rariores and James Bateman’s Orchidaceae of Mexico and Guatemala (1837–43), boasting the largest lithographic plates ever produced.  Wilfrid Blunt had nothing but praise for Gauci, calling him “a master of the process, he ranged his tone from the palest of silvery greys to the richest velvet black; his outline is never mechanical or obtrusive.”

He also produced the lithography for John Forbes Royle, Illustrations of the botany and other branches of the natural history of the Himalayan Mountains, and of the flora of Cashmere. Vol.II – Plates, London: Wm.H. Allen & Co., 1840.

Gauci also painted portrait miniatures in his early career and he later produced lithographed portraits. Many of his portraits are in the National Portrait Gallery, London.  See here.

References

1774 births
1854 deaths
18th-century Maltese artists
19th-century British artists
19th-century lithographers
19th-century Maltese artists
British lithographers
Burials at Highgate Cemetery
Maltese emigrants to the United Kingdom
Maltese lithographers
People from Valletta
Portrait miniaturists